Saparo–Yawan (Zaparo–Yaguan, Zaparo–Peba) is a language family proposal uniting two small language families of the western Amazon. It was first proposed by Swadesh (1954), and continues through Payne (1984) and Kaufman (1994).

Links 
There are also four language isolates and otherwise unclassified languages which have been indirectly linked to Saparo–Yawan, and for convenience they are included here. Tovar (1984) proposed a connection between Zaparoan and the otherwise unclassified Taushiro; Stark (1985) and Gordon (2005) see a connection with the extinct Omurano language. The extinct Awishiri and the Candoshi isolate have lexical similarities with Taushiro, Omurano, and each other; however, the four languages also have lexical similarities with Zaparoan, Jivaroan, and Arawakan. These six languages and families in the table at right have not been linked in any coherent fashion. Given that Candoshi is well described, this is something that may be resolved relatively soon.

Proposed classification 
This forms part of Kaufman's Macro-Andean proposal:
Sáparo–Yawan (Kaufman 2007)
Sáparo (Zaparoan)
Yawan
Peva–Yawan (Peba–Yaguan)
Sabela (Huaorani)
Taushiro, almost extinct
Omurano

See also 
 South America

References 

Proposed language families
Indigenous languages of the Americas